Viva is a weekly fashion magazine for women, published in the Netherlands.

History and profile

Since 2001 it is published by Sanoma, and has a circulation of 70.000 copies (2012).

In 2012, Viva celebrated its 40th anniversary. The magazine used Layar to create an interactive magazine cover.

Editor-in-chief

1972-1975: Joop Swart
1975-1983: Jet den Blanken
1983-1984: Hanny van den Horst (acting) 
1984-1989: Adri de Vries
1989-1991: Koos de Boer
1991-1992: Koos de Boer & Rob van Vuure
1992-1993: Koos de Boer & Tineke Verhoeven
1993-2001: Tineke Verhoeven
2001-2005: Marije de Jong
2005-2008: Karin van Gilst
2008-2012: Corinne van Duin
2012-2014:   Gijsje van Bentum
2014-2015: Vivianne Bendermacher
2015: Ellen de Jong (a.i.)
2016: Kirsten Steenvoort, Sabine Brusse
2017-present: Debby Gerritsen

References

External links

 Official website  (archived) 

1972 establishments in the Netherlands
Dutch-language magazines
Magazines established in 1972
Magazines published in Amsterdam
Weekly magazines published in the Netherlands
Women's fashion magazines
Women's magazines published in the Netherlands